Nikolinci (Serbian Cyrillic: Николинци) is a village in Serbia. It is situated in the Alibunar municipality, in the South Banat District, Vojvodina province. The village has a Romanian ethnic majority (74.27%) and a population of 1,240 (2002)

Name
In Serbian, the village is known as Nikolinci (Николинци), in Romanian as Nicolinț, in Hungarian as Temesmiklós, and in German as Nikolinzi.

Historical population

See also
List of places in Serbia
List of cities, towns and villages in Vojvodina

References

Slobodan Ćurčić, Broj stanovnika Vojvodine, Novi Sad, 1996.

External links
Official page of Nikolinci

Populated places in South Banat District
Populated places in Serbian Banat
Alibunar
Romanian communities in Serbia